Abu Yedda or Ibn Yedda Douanas or Yedder was a Berber leader of the 10th century. He is a member of the tribe of Banu Ifran when he murders his uncle Habbous. The Banu Ifren tribe was unhappy with him. Yedda crosses to Spain with Zenetes troops in 992. Yedda partnered with the Berbers when they defeated the armies of the King of Spain and the Mehdi. He was killed and buried in Spain after the battle. His family governed in Cordoba for three centuries.

History of Abu Yeddas and his sons 

 Version 1

He murdered his cousin Yeddou from the Banou Ifren tribe. Subsequently, he moved to Spain and became a military leader of the Berber rebellion in Spain around 1009.

 Version 2

According to Slane's version, Abu Yeddas Ibn Dounas killed Habbous Ibn Ziri, leader of the Banu Ifren dynasty. A revolt then broke out against Abu Yeddas. The latter decides to go with his brothers to Spain. At that time, the Umayyads of Spain were going through an internal crisis. Abu Yeddas enjoyed a title as a sovereign due to his bravery. He was gifted in the art of war. In 1009, El Mostain gathers all the Berbers of Spain and names Cordoba as capital and declares war on El Mehdi. The latter had capitulated in Cordoba and he went to seek help from Don Raymond tale of Barcelona. El Mehdi and the King of Galicia will march against El Mostain. Abu Yeddas will die in battle, but the battle will be won by the Berbers. Abu Yeddas will be buried at the very place of this glorious battle of the Berbers, on the edge of Guadiaro in the province of Cadiz. He will be venerated by all the Berbers of Spain. Subsequently, the sons and grandsons of Abu Yeddas will have to govern the entire province of Cordoba in the tenth century.

List of the names of the heads of government of Cordoba from the family of Abu Yeddas during the Hammudite dynasty 
List of governors during the Hammudite dynasty:

 Khalouf (son of Abu Yeddas)
 Temim Ibn Khalouf
 Yahia (son of Abderhamane, son of Attaf)

History of the brothers of Abu Yeddas 
According to Ibn Khaldoun, Abou Yeddas went to Spain with his brothers, Abou Corra, Abou Zeid and Attaf

Abu Nour takes Rounda by force around 1014 from the Umayyad hands. He declares the province independent and belongs to the Banou Ifren family. Around 1058, Abu Nour was invited to his rival Ibn Abbad, lord of Seville. Ibn Abbad will try to trap Abu Nour by presenting him with a letter from a supposed concubine of his son. Abu Nour decides to kill his son because he had a concubine. In the end, Abu Nour discovers the truth, that is, Abu Abbad plotted an ambush targeting Abu Nour directly. The latter will die of grief.

Around 1065, Abu Nasr subsequently took power, being the second son of Abu Nour. He will be killed in treachery by a member of his bodyguard, who was in the service of Ibn Abbad.

 Another version of the facts according to Firas Tayyib:

The son of Corra, Abou Nour will be lord of Ronda and Seville in Andalusia from 1023 to 1039 and from 1039 to 1054. Nour Badis ben Hallal's son from 1054 to 1057 in Ronda. Abou Nacer from 1057 to 1065 in Ronda.

The Banou Ifren flag in Ronda was white and red.

References

Ifranid dynasty
10th-century Berber people
Berber rulers